Wiltshire is a county in south-west England.

Wiltshire may also refer to:

Places
Wiltshire (district), a district of Wiltshire, England, covered by Wiltshire Council
Wiltshire (European Parliament constituency)
Wiltshire, Tasmania, a locality in north-west Tasmania, Australia
Wiltshire (UK Parliament constituency)

People with the surname
Bob Wiltshire (1932–2015), Australian rules footballer
Graham Wiltshire (1931–2017), English cricketer
Kelly Wiltshire, Canadian linebacker
Patricia Wiltshire, British forensic ecologist, botanist and palynologist
Ray Wiltshire (1913–1990), Australian politician
Sarah Wiltshire, British footballer
Samuel Paul Wiltshire (1891–1967), English mycologist and phytopathologist
Stephen Wiltshire, British architectural artist and autistic savant

See also
Wilshire (disambiguation)
Wilshere
Willshire (disambiguation)